Tasnim (Tasnīm) or Tasneem may refer to:

a well of water in Paradise according to Islam

Given name
 Tasneem Essop, South African politician
 Tasneem Motara (born 1982), South African politician
 Tasneem Roc, Australian television and film actress of Burmese and Scottish descent
 Tasneem Sheikh, Indian actress
 Tasneem Zehra Husain, Pakistani theoretical physicist
 Tasneem Qureishi, a fictional character from the American TV series Homeland

Surname
 Ahmed Tasnim, Pakistan Navy admiral

See also
 Tasneem Tafsir, a tafsir (interpretation) of the Quran by Javadi Amoli
 Tasnim News Agency

Pakistani unisex given names
Pakistani masculine given names
Pakistani feminine given names
Surnames of Pakistani origin
Surnames of Indian origin